Abdallah al-Ghalib Billah (b. 1517 – d. 22 January 1574, 1557–1574) was the second Saadian sultan of Morocco. He succeeded his father Mohammed al-Shaykh as Sultan of Morocco.

Biography

Early life 
With his first wife Sayyida Rabia, Mohammed al-Shaykh had three sons, but the two oldest had died while he was still alive (in 1550 and in 1551). Abdallah, the third, was 40 years old when he became sultan and received the name al-Ghalib Billah. Before that he had been vice-king of Marrakesh and governor of Fes.

Shortly after Abdallah came to power, three of his younger brothers fled the country and joined the Ottoman Turks. Abd al-Malik and Ahmad, both future Sultans of Morocco, spent 17 years in exile in the Ottoman Empire, moving between Algiers and Constantinople, where they were trained by the Ottomans.
 
During a relatively peaceful reign Abdallah succeeded in warding off both the Spanish and the Turks and in consolidating the sovereignty of the Saadians over Morocco.

Battle of Wadi al-Laban 
He fought the invading Turks in 1558 at the Battle of Wadi al-Laban. The Ottomans then had to retreat because the Spaniards launched an expedition on Oran. The Moroccan ruler formed an alliance with the Spanish against the Ottomans. After his victory he even occupied Tlemcen for a short period. In 1568 he supported the insurrection of the Moriscos in Spain.

Architecture 
During his reign, Abdallah al-Ghalib Billah resided in Marrakesh. He was a prolific builder who was responsible for building, among other projects, the Mouassin Mosque, a maristan (a hospital usually attached to a mosque), and the Ben Youssef Medrassa. He repaired and restored the originally Almohad-built Kasbah Mosque and he is also believed to have begun the first mausoleum of the Saadian Tombs located behind the mosque.

Death 
Abdallah al-Ghalib Billah died on 22 January 1574 of an asthma attack. After his reign, a period of civil war was to follow that lasted four years. He was succeeded by his son Abdallah Mohammed, despite a Saadian inheritance rule that decreed that the throne pass on to his eldest surviving brother, the exiled Abd al-Malik.

Notes

See also
 List of rulers of Morocco
 History of Morocco

Sultans of Morocco
1517 births
1574 deaths
People from Marrakesh
Respiratory disease deaths in Morocco
Deaths from asthma
Saadi dynasty
16th-century Moroccan people
16th-century monarchs in Africa
16th-century Arabs